McCann/Wilson is an album by pianist Les McCann with the Gerald Wilson Orchestra recorded in 1964 and released on the Pacific Jazz label.

Reception

Allmusic gives the album 3 stars.

Track listing 
All compositions by Les McCann except as indicated
 "Could Be" - 6:06
 "Stragler" - 2:36
 "Restin' in Jail" - 3:53
 "Bailor the Wailor" - 3:05
 "Maleah" - 4:00
 "Lot of Living to Do" (Charles Strouse, Lee Adams) - 4:58
 "Kathleen's Theme" - 2:58
 "Gus Gus" - 3:14

Personnel 
Les McCann - piano
Teddy Edwards - tenor saxophone
Dennis Budimir - guitar
Victor Gaskin - bass
Paul Humphrey - drums
The Gerald Wilson Orchestra  arranged and conducted by Gerald Wilson

References 

Les McCann albums
Gerald Wilson albums
1965 albums
Pacific Jazz Records albums
Albums arranged by Gerald Wilson
Albums conducted by Gerald Wilson